Journey is the seventh studio album of J-Pop band w-inds. It was released on March 7, 2007. It reached 8th place on the Oricon Weekly Albums Chart.

Track listing
"This Is Our Show"
"Top Secret"
"Is That You"
"Crazy for You"
"Devil"
"Trial"
"Toui Kioku" (遠い記憶 / Distant Memory)
"Milky Way"
"Journey"
"Message" (メッセージ)
"Chizu Naki Tabiji" (地図なき旅路 / ''Journey Without a Map)
"Celebration"
"Boogie Woogie 66" (ブギウギ)
"Triangle"
"Hanamuke" (ハナムケ / Gift)

Charts and sales

Oricon sales charts (Japan)

References

2007 albums
Pony Canyon albums